Yudi Township is a township under the administration of Youyang Tujia and Miao Autonomous County, Chongqing, China. , it has four villages under its administration: Shangyu, Xiayu, Gaozhuang, and Fengjia.

References 

Township-level divisions of Chongqing
Youyang Tujia and Miao Autonomous County